CJEU is a Canadian radio station licensed to broadcast a French language children's radio format at AM 1670 in Gatineau, Quebec. The license is held by Fondation Radio-Enfant, a non-profit educational agency.

Fondation Radio-Enfant was originally granted a short-term license, with the call sign CIRC, on 96.5 FM for the duration of the Rendez-vous de la Francophonie in 2002 and in 2003, Fondation Radio-Enfant was also granted to operate at 1250 kHz on the AM dial (formerly used by CBOF), however, due to possible technical issues, the station never went on the air. The 96.5 frequency in Gatineau was later reassigned to CFTX-FM, and Fondation Radio-Enfant was granted a permanent AM license in early 2007 to operate at 1670 kHz.

Initially, CJEU played music mainly in French and sung by children. Most of the music that is played, however, was not professionally recorded.

In late 2010, the station was renamed as Radio Oxygène, expanding its programming to include programs for teenagers and young adults. Programming for younger listeners was renamed Radio-Enfant-Ado. At one point, the station was known as Radio Jeunesse.

In 2015, the CRTC approved an ownership change for CJEU from Fondation Radio Enfant du Canada to Radio Communautaire Enfant-Ado de Gatineau-Ottawa.

References

External links
 radiojeunesse.ca
 Radio Oxygène
 Radio-Enfant-Ado
 

Jeu
Jeu
Jeu
Children's radio stations
2007 establishments in Quebec
Radio stations established in 2007